The Qushla or The Qishleh (Arabic: القشلة) is an Ottoman site in Baghdad, Iraq.
The Qushla lays at Rusafa side of the Iraqi capital.
The Ottoman Wali (governor) Namiq Pasha started the building in 1881. The building was finished after him by the next Wali Madhat Pasha.

References

External links

 Iraq Restores Historic Ottoman Site
 Al-Qushla Building (UNESCO)

Buildings and structures in Baghdad